The 1948 South Dakota State Jackrabbits football team was an American football team that represented South Dakota State University in the North Central Conference during the 1948 college football season. In its second season under head coach Ralph Ginn, the team compiled a 4–6 record and outscored opponents by a total of 203 to 107.

Schedule

References

South Dakota State
South Dakota State Jackrabbits football seasons
South Dakota State Jackrabbits football